Dasiosoma is a genus of beetles in the family Carabidae, containing the following species:

 Dasiosoma basilewskyi Shi and Liang, 2013
 Dasiosoma bellum (Habu, 1979)
 Dasiosoma hirsutum (Bates, 1873)
 Dasiosoma indicum (Kirschenhofer, 2011)
 Dasiosoma ivorense Basilewsky, 1968
 Dasiosoma maindroni (Tian & Deuve, 2001)
 Dasiosoma quadraticolle Shi and Liang, 2013
 Dasiosoma sudanicum Basilewsky, 1949
 Dasiosoma testaceum Britton, 1937

Dasiosoma hirsutum Basilewsky, 1949 was renamed to Dasiosoma basilewskyi Shi and Liang, 2013, resulting in the former name becoming a secondary junior homonym to Dasiosoma hirsutum (Bates, 1873). Due to little to no research done by scientists. Facts of high certainty surrounding the genus are currently exotic. Most scientists know

References

Lebiinae